Gaber (an alternative transliteration of the Arabic name Jaber or Jabir) may refer to:

Places
Gaber, Dobrich Province, Bulgaria
Gaber, Sofia Province, Bulgaria
Gaber pri Črmošnjicah, Slovenia

People
Eman Gaber (born 1989), Egyptian female fencer
Ernst Gaber (1907–1975), German rower 
Garry M. Gaber, video game designer and programmer
Giorgio Gaber (Giorgio Gaberscik, 1939-2003), Italian singer-songwriter, actor and playwright 
Harley Gaber (1943–2011), American visual artist and composer 
Karam Gaber (born 1979), Egyptian Greco-Roman wrestler
Lamis Gaber, Egyptian politician
Matej Gaber (born 1991), Slovenian handball player 
Mido Gaber (Mohamed Gaber Tawfik Hussein, born 1995), Egyptian footballer 
Mihály Gáber (1753–1815), Slovene priest and writer
Omar Gaber (born 1992), Egyptian football player
Sharon Gaber (born 1964), American academic
Sherif Gaber (born c. 1993), Egyptian political activist

Other uses
FK Gaber, a Macedonian football club

See also

Jaber (disambiguation)
Geber (disambiguation)